The 2020–21 Cupa României was the 83rd season of the annual Romanian primary football knockout tournament. The winner qualified for the second qualifying round of the 2021–22 UEFA Europa Conference League. Times up to 26 October 2020 and from 29 March 2021 are EEST (UTC+3). Times between 27 October 2020 and 28 March 2021 are EET (UTC+2).

Participating clubs
The following 128 teams qualified for the competition:

Round and draw dates

Source:

Preliminary rounds

The first rounds, and any preliminaries, are organised by the Regional Leagues.

First round
All matches were played on 9 September 2020.

|colspan="3" style="background-color:#97DEFF"|9 September 2020

|}

Second round
All matches were played on 22 September 2020.

|colspan="3" style="background-color:#97DEFF"|22 September 2020

|}

Third round
The matches were played on 6,7 and 8 October 2020.

|colspan="3" style="background-color:#97DEFF"|6 October 2020

|-
|colspan="3" style="background-color:#97DEFF"|7 October 2020

|-
|colspan="3" style="background-color:#97DEFF"|8 October 2020

|}

Fourth round
The matches were played on 20 and 21 October 2020.

|colspan="3" style="background-color:#97DEFF"|20 October 2020

|-
|colspan="3" style="background-color:#97DEFF"|21 October 2020

|}

Round of 32
The matches were played on 27, 28, 29 and 30 November 2020.

|colspan="3" style="background-color:#97DEFF"|27 November 2020

|-
|colspan="3" style="background-color:#97DEFF"|28 November 2020

|-
|colspan="3" style="background-color:#97DEFF"|29 November 2020

|-
|colspan="3" style="background-color:#97DEFF"|30 November 2020

|}

Round of 16
The matches were played on 9, 10 and 11 February 2021.

|colspan="3" style="background-color:#97DEFF"|9 February 2021

|-
|colspan="3" style="background-color:#97DEFF"|10 February 2021

|-
|colspan="3" style="background-color:#97DEFF"|11 February 2021

|-
|}

Quarter-finals
The matches were played on 2, 3 and 4 March 2021.

|-
|}

Semi-finals
The semi-final matches are played in a two-legged system. The first legs were played 13 and 14 April 2021 and the second legs were played on 11 May 2021.

|}

Final

References

 
Romania
Cupa României seasons